Yong Jun-hyung is a South Korean singer-songwriter, rapper, record producer, and actor. He is a member of the South Korean boy group Highlight.

Beast/Highlight albums

Solo work

Other works

References 

Highlight (band)
Lists of songs
Yong Jun-hyung
Yong Jun-hyung